Antonio Rizzolo (born 22 April 1969) is an Italian football manager and former professional player.

Career
Born in Orvieto, Rizzolo played as a forward in Italy and Spain for Lazio, Pescara, Atalanta, Padova, Palermo, Lecce, Reggiana, Ascoli, Ternana, Albacete, Avellino, Sestrese, Lecco, Pisa, Latina, Cisco Collatino and Monterotondo.

He also made 7 appearances for the Italian under-21 national team, scoring 1 goal. He also participated at the 1987 FIFA World Youth Championship.

He was manager of Città di Castello between 2010 and 2011.

References

1969 births
Living people
People from Orvieto
Italian footballers
Italy youth international footballers
Italy under-21 international footballers
Italian football managers
Italian expatriate footballers
Italian expatriate sportspeople in Spain
Expatriate footballers in Spain
S.S. Lazio players
Delfino Pescara 1936 players
Atalanta B.C. players
Calcio Padova players
Palermo F.C. players
U.S. Lecce players
A.C. Reggiana 1919 players
Ascoli Calcio 1898 F.C. players
Ternana Calcio players
Albacete Balompié players
U.S. Avellino 1912 players
F.S. Sestrese Calcio 1919 players
Calcio Lecco 1912 players
Pisa S.C. players
Latina Calcio 1932 players
Atletico Roma F.C. players
Pol. Monterotondo Lupa players
Serie B players
Serie A players
Segunda División players
Serie C players
Association football forwards
Sportspeople from the Province of Terni
Footballers from Umbria